Liane Linden (April 1, 1920 – November 30, 2014) was a Swedish film and stage actress. She appeared in the 1939 British crime film The Arsenal Stadium Mystery.

Selected filmography
 The Arsenal Stadium Mystery (1939)
 Lärarinna på vift (1941)
 Lasse-Maja (1941)
 How to Tame a Real Man (1941)
 Blizzard (1944)
 Moon Over Hellesta (1956)
 Hide and Seek (1963)

References

Bibliography
 Mayer, Geoff. Guide to British Cinema. Greenwood Publishing Group, 2003.
 Richards, Jeffrey. Thorold Dickinson: The Man and His Films. Croom Helm, 1986.

External links

1920 births
2014 deaths
Swedish film actresses
Swedish stage actresses
20th-century Swedish actresses
People from Gothenburg